The 1776 Rhode Island gubernatorial election was the first election in the State after its secession from British colonies and joining the United States.

The election was organized for April 3, 1776, when Nicholas Cooke won unopposed with 100% of the vote.

Cooke had also governed the State when it was a Colony.

References 

Rhode Island
1776
Gubernatorial